Ganyari may refer to:

 Ganyari, Berasia, a village in Bhopal district, India
 Ganyari, Huzur, a village in Bhopal district, India